Leonardo Mazzantini (born 6 September 1953) is an Italian former racing cyclist, who competed as a professional from 1977 to 1983.

Major results
Sources:

1974
 3rd Piccolo Giro di Lombardia
1977
 4th Trofeo Pantalica
 5th Gran Premio Città di Camaiore
 8th Giro della Provincia di reggio Calabria
1978
 3rd Giro della Provincia di reggio Calabria
1979
 1st Coppa Sabatini
 1st GP Montelupo
 3rd Overall Tour de Suisse
 5th Gran Premio Città di Camaiore
 7th Giro del Lazio
 8th Coppa Placci
 9th Coppa Agostoni
 10th Tre Valli Varesine
1980
 2nd GP Industria & Commercio di Prato
 2nd Overall (TTT) Cronostaffetta
 4th Tre Valli Varesine
1981
 1st Giro di Campania
 6th Coppa Placci
 8th Giro del Veneto
1983
 9th Giro del Veneto

Grand Tour general classification results timeline

References

External links

1953 births
Living people
Italian male cyclists
People from Empoli
Sportspeople from the Metropolitan City of Florence
Cyclists from Tuscany